School District 127 may refer to:
 Grayslake Community High School District 127
 Worth School District 127